Edward Oscar Hendricks (May 3, 1929 – January 19, 1980) was a prominent American Anglo-Catholic priest who served most notably as rector of S. Clement's Church, Philadelphia from 1965 to 1978. A graduate of the University of Texas at Austin (1951), he was rector of the Church of the Holy Family, McKinney, Texas and the former Christ Church, Elizabeth, New Jersey (burned January 16, 1988) before coming to S. Clement's.

He died of liver failure in Kemp, Texas, and was buried in the family plot at Oakland Memorial Park in Terrell, Texas. He was unmarried.

References 
Obituary, The Philadelphia Inquirer, January 23, 1980, p. 60.

External links 
Leaflet for the Institution of Rev. Edward Hendricks as Rector of St. Clement’s Church (1965) from Philadelphia Studies
Grave from Find a Grave

1929 births
1980 deaths
American Anglo-Catholics
American priests